Ixodes trianguliceps is a species of ticks from the family Ixodidae that feeds on such mammals as shrew, rats, mice, hedgehogs, foxes, squirrels, moles, rabbits and hares. It also frequently feeds on horses and humans. It is also found in Belarus, Bulgaria, the Czech Republic, the Netherlands, Slovenia, Moldova, Ukraine and Russia.

References

External links
Map of species distribution

Further reading

trianguliceps
Animals described in 1895
Arachnids of Europe
Parasitic arthropods of mammals